Sir William Smyth, 1st Baronet (c. 1616 – 1696) was an English politician who sat in the House of Commons at various times between 1640 and 1679. He supported the Royalist cause in the English Civil War.

Smyth was the son of Robert Smyth of Buckingham and Akeley, Buckinghamshire and his wife Martha. He matriculated at Trinity College, Oxford, on 13 March 1635 aged 18, but left without taking a degree. He was called to the bar at Middle Temple in 1641.

In 1641, he was elected Member of Parliament for Winchelsea in the Long Parliament. He supported the King in the Civil War and was governor of Chepstow Castle. He was created DCL at Oxford on 10 November 1642. He was disabled from sitting in Parliament on 16 January 1644. His father was killed at Oxford in 1645 during the war.

After the Restoration of the Monarchy, Smyth was created baronet of Redcliff, Buckinghamshire on 10 May 1661. In 1661 he was elected MP for  Buckingham in the Cavalier Parliament.

Smyth died at Stepney at the age of about 80 and requested in his will to be buried at Akeley. He had married firstly Margaret Denton, daughter of Sir Alexander Denton of Hillesden and married secondly a daughter of Sir Nathaniel Hobart. His only surviving son Thomas succeeded to the baronetcy.

References

1610s births
1696 deaths

Year of birth uncertain
Alumni of Trinity College, Oxford
Members of the Middle Temple
Cavaliers
Baronets in the Baronetage of England
English MPs 1640–1648
English MPs 1661–1679